The Hong Kong Film Award for Best Film is an annual Hong Kong industry award presented to the films which is considered the best of the year.

History
The award was established at the 1st Hong Kong Film Awards (1982) and the first winner and the sole participant in this category was Father and Son, a film by Allen Fong. From the 2nd Hong Kong Film Awards (1983), there are 5, sometimes 6, nominations for the category of Best Film from which one film is chosen the winner of the Hong Kong Film Award for Best Film. The most recent recipient of the award was Trivisa by Johnnie To and Yau Nai-hoi, which was honoured at the 36th Hong Kong Film Awards (2017).

Winners and nominees

1982 — 1999

2000 — present

See also 
 Hong Kong Film Award
 Hong Kong Film Award for Best Actor
 Hong Kong Film Award for Best Actress
 Hong Kong Film Award for Best Supporting Actor
 Hong Kong Film Award for Best Supporting Actress
 Hong Kong Film Award for Best Action Choreography
 Hong Kong Film Award for Best Cinematography
 Hong Kong Film Award for Best Director
 Hong Kong Film Award for Best New Performer

References

External links
 Hong Kong Film Awards Official Site

 
Awards for best film
Hong Kong Film Awards
Awards established in 1982